FC Viktoriya Mykolaivka is an amateur Ukrainian football from Mykolaivka, Bilopillia Raion. The club is owned by an agriculture company LNZ Group.

History 
The club was created in 2015.

Honours 
 Ukrainian Football Amateur League
 Winners (2): 2017–18, 2019–20
 Runners-up (1): 2018–19
 Ukrainian Amateur Cup
 Runners-up (2): 2017–18, 2019–20
 Sumy Oblast Championship
 Runners-up (2): 2015, 2016
 Sumy Oblast Winter Championship
 Winner (1): 2016
 Sumy Oblast Cup
 Runners-up (2): 2015

Current squad

Head coaches 
 2015 – 2021 Artem Radionov
 2021 – 2022 Anatoliy Bezsmertnyi
 2022 – present Volodymyr Romanenko (caretaker)

See also
 FC LNZ-Lebedyn
 FC Alians Lypova Dolyna

References

External links 
 Official website. (archived)

 
Association football clubs established in 2015
2015 establishments in Ukraine
Football clubs in Sumy Oblast
Ukrainian Second League clubs